Muckety is a web site launched in 2007 by former newspaper journalists.

The site uses interactive maps powered by Adobe Flash to show relationships between people, businesses and organizations.

Muckety also publishes news stories about influential people and their connections to government, business and one another.

The Economist described Muckety as an "American site which enriches news stories with interactive maps of the protagonists’ networks of influence" in its May 2009 article titled "The rebirth of news".

Muckety was also featured on the New York Times Economix blog in May 2009.  Catherine Rampell described Muckety as "catnip for conspiracy theorists" using the Muckety map of former Federal Reserve Bank of New York chairman Stephen Friedman (PFIAB) and his ties to Goldman Sachs an example of the importance of networks.

Partners 
Two of the founders of Muckety - Laurie Bennett and John Decker - were also partners in ePodunk, a web site about communities in the U.S., Canada, UK and Ireland. ePodunk was sold to Internet Brands in 2007.

Clients 
In September 2009 Crain Communications incorporated interactive Muckety maps in its annual report on Who's Who in Chicago Business.

Awards 
Muckety won the award for "Outstanding Use of Digital Technologies, Small Site"  at 2009 Online Journalism Awards presented by the Online News Association.

The judges' comments about Muckety: "This is impressive from a technical standpoint.. Even if I can understand how these diagrams were built, it impresses me that they can be manipulated, expanded, contracted, saved, centered, trimmed, etc. at this level. Wow. Not only does this site’s technology produce cutting-edge and relevant journalism, but it allows you to do the same."

Muckety has been taken down without explanation in late 2017.

References

External links 
 

American news websites